Heath Hill is a locality in Victoria, Australia,  south-east of Melbourne's Central Business District, located within the Shires of Baw Baw and Cardinia local government areas. Heath Hill recorded a population of 189 at the 2021 census.

Heath Hill Post Office opened on 1 June 1883 and closed in 1962.

See also
 City of Cranbourne – Heath Hill was previously within this former local government area.

References

Towns in Victoria (Australia)
Shire of Baw Baw
Shire of Cardinia